Henmi (written: 辺見 or 逸見) is a Japanese surname. Notable people with the surname include:

, Japanese actress and singer
, Japanese writer and poet
, Japanese singer, tarento, and actress
, Japanese swordsman and police officer

Japanese-language surnames